Johannes Henricus Antonius Lokin (21 February 1945 – 19 June 2022), also known as Jan Lokin, was a Dutch professor in legal history, specialising in Roman law at the University of Groningen.

Lokin studied at Leiden University and the University of Groningen and obtained his Master of Laws degree in 1967. In 1973, he graduated under Prof. H.J. Scheltema, whom he succeeded as a professor in Roman law at the University of Groningen in 1977.

He was a member of the Royal Netherlands Academy of Arts and Sciences since 2002. He was highly published in history of law.

Lokin died in Groningen on 19 June 2022, at the age of 77.

References 

1945 births
2022 deaths
Dutch historians
Leiden University alumni
University of Groningen alumni
Academic staff of the University of Groningen
Members of the Royal Netherlands Academy of Arts and Sciences
Legal historians
People from Ommen